Lake Myrtle Sports Complex is a multi-purpose sports complex located in Auburndale within the state of Florida, in the United States.

Facilities
The site currently consists of eleven soccer fields, nine baseball fields, and facilities to host top-level sports events. The Florida Sports Hall of Fame is also located in the complex.

Main Event Fields

The park has two main stadium fields, one for soccer capable of accommodating 1,500 spectators and one for baseball that can seat 500 people.

References

External links
Lake Myrtle Sports Complex Official Website

Multi-purpose stadiums in the United States
Soccer venues in Florida
Auburndale, Florida
Baseball venues in Florida
Sports venues completed in 2009
Buildings and structures in Polk County, Florida
2009 establishments in Florida
Florida Tropics SC
Sports complexes in Florida